The Regional Municipality of Hamilton–Wentworth was a Regional Municipality in Ontario, Canada, that existed between the dates of January 1, 1974, and January 1, 2001, primarily centered on the City of Hamilton. It was proclaimed and created in 1974 by restructuring Wentworth County and it's constituent municipalities into the newly created Region of Hamilton–Wentworth.

It was one of the last Regional Municipalities to be created in Ontario, and it served as an upper-tier level of municipal government, aggregating municipal services on a region-wide basis like the other Counties and Regional Municipalities in Southern Ontario. The Regional Municipality was dissolved in 2001, with the towns and cities in the Region of Hamilton–Wentworth merging to form the current single-tier City of Hamilton, with a 2021 total population of 569,353.

Overview

Regional Municipalities were an experiment in two-tiered municipalities created between the late 1960s to mid-1970s. They existed mainly in the Golden Horseshoe of southern Ontario, but also existed in the form of the Regional Municipality of Sudbury in northern Ontario and the Regional Municipality of Ottawa-Carleton in eastern Ontario. The regions were proved somewhat controversial upon their creation and the Regional Municipality of Hamilton–Wentworth was one of the last created by this process. Almost immediately after its creation, some sort of merger was advocated, with "Wentworth" being among some of the candidate names for the new megacity.

The Regional Municipality of Hamilton–Wentworth was established as an Upper-Tier Municipality and comprised the bulk of the former Wentworth County, of which it replaced. Its Lower-Tier Municipalities were, in order of population, the city of Hamilton, the town (later city) of Stoney Creek, the town of Ancaster, the town of Flamborough, the town of Dundas and the township of Glanbrook.

The Region provided Police Services, Public Transit, and Social Services, while the lower-tier provided Fire Services and Recreation Services; although, both tiers shared the responsibility for maintaining Roads and Water.
It was governed by a Regional Chair who presided over a Regional Council with representatives from each of Hamilton's wards and two each from other constituent municipalities. Near the end of its existence, the Regional Chair was chosen by Direct Election.

History
The Regional Municipality of Hamilton–Wentworth was created by Act of the Legislative Assembly of Ontario in 1973, which took effect on January 1, 1974. The creation of the Regional Municipality resulted in the consolidation of the former municipalities of Wentworth County into six new municipalities:

Merger
A different Progressive Conservative government amalgamated all of the constituent municipalities in Hamilton–Wentworth into the larger single-tier City of Hamilton in 2001, against great opposition from its suburban and rural parts. This was part of a broader series of municipal reorganizations in urban and rural Ontario, and was also the fate of Metropolitan Toronto, the Regional Municipality of Ottawa–Carleton, Chatham-Kent, Prince Edward County, and many others.

References

Former counties in Ontario
Populated places disestablished in 2001
History of Hamilton, Ontario